Beasdale railway station is a railway station serving Glen Beasdale in the Highland region of Scotland. This station is on the West Highland Line, sited  from the former Banavie Junction, between Lochailort and Arisaig. ScotRail manage the station and operate all services.

History 

It was originally a private station for the nearby Arisaig House but was open to the public from 6 September 1965.

By the later part of the century its main users were local school children who went to school at Lochaber High just outside Fort William.

The derelict station house was sold in the 1980s and is now a private holiday home but the station platform is still railway property with a bus shelter type shelter providing rudimentary cover from the rain.

Facilities 
The station is equipped with a bench, a shelter and a help point, with a small car park adjacent to the station.

Passenger volume 
Beasdale was one of six railway stations in Britain to see zero passengers in the 2020/21 period, due to decreased travel throughout the COVID-19 pandemic. It is therefore Britain's joint-least-used station alongside Abererch, Llanbedr, Sampford Courtenay, Stanlow and Thornton and Sugar Loaf.

The statistics cover twelve month periods that start in April.

Services
On Sunday there are two Glasgow trains and one to Fort William.

References

Bibliography

External links

 RAILSCOT on Mallaig Extension Railway

Railway stations in Highland (council area)
Railway stations served by ScotRail
Railway request stops in Great Britain
Railway stations in Great Britain opened in 1901
Former North British Railway stations
Low usage railway stations in the United Kingdom